Jalen Tolliver (born December 30, 1995) is an American football wide receiver for the San Antonio Brahmas of the XFL. He played college football at Arkansas–Monticello, and was signed by the Arizona Cardinals as an undrafted free agent after the 2018 NFL Draft and played in three games in 2019.

College career
Tolliver played four seasons for the Boll Weevils. After catching 22 passes for 322 yards and 15 touchdowns as a freshman, Tolliver became a starter for the team going into his sophomore year and was named second-team All-Great American Conference (GAC) after recording 39 receptions for 781 yards and seven touchdowns. He led the conference in receptions (69), receiving yards (1,090), and receiving touchdowns (14) in his junior season and was named first-team All-GAC and an honorable mention All-American. As a senior, Tolliver had 67 receptions for 1,109 yards and led Division II with 16 touchdown receptions and was named a first-team All-GAC, the GAC Offensive Player of the Year and second-team All-America by the Associated Press. Over the course of his collegiate career he caught 192 passes for 3,168 yards and 39 touchdowns.

Professional career

Arizona Cardinals
Tolliver signed with the Arizona Cardinals as an undrafted free agent on April 30, 2018. He was cut at the end of training camp and subsequently re-signed to the team's practice squad on September 2, 2018. He was first promoted to the Cardinals' active roster on November 21, 2018, but was subsequently released three days later without appearing in a game. Tolliver was re-signed to the Cardinals' practice squad and then again promoted to the active roster on December 4, 2018. Tolliver made his NFL debut on December 9, 2018, in a 17–3 loss to the Detroit Lions, making two catches for 22 yards. He finished his rookie season with eight receptions for 110 yards in three games played. He was waived on May 9, 2019.

Tennessee Titans
On May 16, 2019, Tolliver signed with the Tennessee Titans. He was waived on August 10, 2019.

Kansas City Chiefs
Tolliver was signed by the Kansas City Chiefs on August 20, 2019. Tolliver was waived by the Chiefs during final roster cuts on August 31, 2019.

Tampa Bay Vipers
Tolliver was drafted by the Tampa Bay Vipers in the fourth round in the 2020 XFL Draft. Tolliver was fourth in the XFL with 297 receiving yards with 21 receptions and one touchdown before the 2020 XFL season was cancelled following growing concerns about COVID-19. He had his contract terminated when the league suspended operations on April 10, 2020.

Edmonton Elks
Tolliver signed with the Edmonton Elks of the CFL on March 4, 2021.

San Antonio Brahmas 
On November 17, 2022, Tolliver was drafted by the San Antonio Brahmas of the XFL, reuniting with his former Offensive coordinator and Head coach Jaime Elizondo.

References

External links
Arkansas–Monticello Boll Weevils bio
Tennessee Titans bio

1995 births
Living people
People from Rayville, Louisiana
Players of American football from Louisiana
American football wide receivers
Arkansas–Monticello Boll Weevils football players
Arizona Cardinals players
Tennessee Titans players
Kansas City Chiefs players
Tampa Bay Vipers players
Edmonton Elks players
San Antonio Brahmas players